Aphyle steinbachi is a moth of the family Erebidae first described by Walter Rothschild in 1909. It found in Bolivia.

References

Moths described in 1909
Phaegopterina
Moths of South America